At the 1948 Summer Olympics in London, a single modern pentathlon event was contested. The event was held at the Aldershot Lido outdoor pool in Hampshire.

Competition format
The modern pentathlon consisted of five events. The competition used a point-for-place system, with the lowest total across the five events winning.

 Riding: a show jumping competition. Riders started with 100 points and could lose points either through obstacle faults or going over the 10-minute time limit. Negative scores were possible. Ties were broken by the specific time taken, with the quicker rider winning.
 Fencing: a round-robin, one-touch épée competition. Score was based on number of bouts won.
 Shooting: a rapid fire pistol competition, with 20 shots (each scoring up to 10 points) per competitor.
 Swimming: a 300 m freestyle swimming competition.
 Running: a 4 km race.

Participating nations
45 athletes from 16 nations competed at the London Games:

Results

References

External links
 

1948 Summer Olympics events
1948
Modern pentathlon competitions in the United Kingdom
Men's events at the 1948 Summer Olympics